The 30th Annual Grammy Awards were held March 2, 1988, at Radio City Music Hall, New York City. They recognized accomplishments by musicians from the previous year.

Album of the Year went to U2 for The Joshua Tree, and Song of the Year went to Barry Mann, Cynthia Weil and James Horner for "Somewhere Out There".

Performers

Award winners 
Record of the Year
"Graceland" – Paul Simon
Paul Simon, producer
"La Bamba" – Los Lobos
Los Lobos & Mitchell Froom, producers
"I Still Haven't Found What I'm Looking For" – U2
Brian Eno & Daniel Lanois, producers
"Luka" – Suzanne Vega
Steve Addabbo & Lenny Kaye, producers
"Back in the High Life Again" – Steve Winwood
 Russ Titelman & Steve Winwood, producers
Album of the Year
The Joshua Tree – U2
Brian Eno & Daniel Lanois, producers
Whitney – Whitney Houston
 Narada Michael Walden, producer
Bad – Michael Jackson
 Michael Jackson & Quincy Jones, producers
Trio – Dolly Parton, Linda Ronstadt & Emmylou Harris
 George Massenburg, producer
Sign o' the Times – Prince
Prince, producer
Song of the Year
"Somewhere Out There" 
James Horner & Will Jennings, songwriters (Linda Ronstadt & James Ingram)
"La Bamba"
Ritchie Valens, songwriter (Los Lobos)
"I Still Haven't Found What I'm Looking For"
Adam Clayton, David Evans, Larry Mullen, Jr. & Paul Hewson, songwriters (U2)
"Luka"
Suzanne Vega, songwriter (Suzanne Vega)
"Didn't We Almost Have It All"
Michael Masser & Will Jennings, songwriters (Whitney Houston)
Best New Artist
Jody Watley
Breakfast Club
Cutting Crew
Terence Trent D'Arby
Swing Out Sister

Blues
Best Traditional Blues Recording
Professor Longhair for Houseparty New Orleans Style
Best Contemporary Blues Recording
The Robert Cray Band for Strong Persuader

Children's
Best Recording for Children
Tom Bradshaw, Mark Sottnick (producers), Bobby McFerrin (producer & artist) & Jack Nicholson for The Elephant's Child

Classical
Best Orchestral Recording
Michael Haas (producer), Georg Solti (conductor) & the Chicago Symphony Orchestra for Beethoven: Symphony No. 9 in D Minor
Best Classical Vocal Soloist Performance
Kathleen Battle for Kathleen Battle - Salzburg Recital
Best Opera Recording
Cord Garben (producer), James Levine (conductor), Agnes Baltsa, Kathleen Battle, Gary Lakes, Hermann Prey, Anna Tomowa-Sintow, & the Vienna Philharmonic Orchestra for R. Strauss: Ariadne Auf Naxos
Best Choral Performance (other than opera)
Robert Shaw (conductor) & the Atlanta Symphony Orchestra & Chorus for Hindemith: When Lilacs Last in the Dooryard Bloom'd
Best Classical Performance - Instrumental Soloist(s) (with orchestra)
James Levine (conductor), Itzhak Perlman & the Vienna Philharmonic for Mozart: Violin Concertos Nos. 2 and 4
Best Classical Performance - Instrumental Soloist(s) (without orchestra)
Vladimir Horowitz for Horowitz in Moscow 
Best Chamber Music Performance
Vladimir Ashkenazy, Lynn Harrell, Itzhak Perlman & for Beethoven: The Complete Piano Trios
Best Contemporary Composition
Krzysztof Penderecki (composer & conductor), Mstislav Rostropovich & the Philharmonia Orchestra for Penderecki: Cello Concerto No. 2 
Best Classical Album
Thomas Frost (producer) & Vladimir Horowitz for Horowitz in Moscow

Comedy
Best Comedy Recording
"A Night at the Met"-Robin Williams

Composing and arranging
Best Instrumental Composition
Ron Carter, Herbie Hancock, Billy Higgins & Wayne Shorter (composers) for Call Sheet Blues performed by various artists
Best Song Written Specifically for a Motion Picture or Television
James Horner, Barry Mann & Cynthia Weil (songwriters) for Somewhere Out There performed by Linda Ronstadt & James Ingram
Best Album of Original Instrumental Background Score Written for a Motion Picture or Television
Ennio Morricone (composer) for The Untouchables
Best Arrangement on an Instrumental
Bill Holman (arranger) for Take The "A" Train performed by The Tonight Show Band with Doc Severinsen
Best Instrumental Arrangement Accompanying Vocal(s)
Frank Foster (arranger) for Deedles' Blues performed by Diane Schuur & the Count Basie Orchestraか

Country
Best Country Vocal Performance, Female
K. T. Oslin for 80's Ladies
Best Country Vocal Performance, Male
Randy Travis for Always & Forever
Best Country Performance by a Duo or Group with Vocal
Emmylou Harris, Dolly Parton & Linda Ronstadt for Trio
Best Country Vocal Performance, Duet
Ronnie Milsap & Kenny Rogers for "Make No Mistake, She's Mine"
Best Country Instrumental Performance (orchestra, group or soloist)
Asleep at the Wheel for String of Pars
Best Country Song
Paul Overstreet & Don Schlitz (songwriters) for "Forever and Ever, Amen" performed by Randy Travis

Folk
Best Traditional Folk Recording
Ladysmith Black Mambazo for Shaka Zulu
Best Contemporary Folk Recording
Steve Goodman for Unfinished Business

Gospel
Best Gospel Performance, Female 
Deniece Williams for I Believe In You
Best Gospel Performance, Male 
Larnelle Harris for The Father Hath Provided
Best Gospel Performance by a Duo or Group, Choir or Chorus
Mylon LeFevre and Broken Heart for Crack the Sky
Best Soul Gospel Performance, Female
CeCe Winans for For Always
Best Soul Gospel Performance, Male
Al Green for Everything's Gonna Be Alright
Best Soul Gospel Performance by a Duo or Group, Choir or Chorus
The Winans & Anita Baker for Ain't No Need to Worry

Historical
Best Historical Album
Orrin Keepnews (producer) for Thelonious Monk - The Complete Riverside Recordings

Jazz
Best Jazz Vocal Performance, Female
Diane Schuur for Diane Schuur & the Count Basie Orchestra
Best Jazz Vocal Performance, Male
Bobby McFerrin for What Is This Thing Called Love
Best Jazz Instrumental Performance, Soloist
Dexter Gordon for The Other Side of Round Midnight
Best Jazz Instrumental Performance, Group
Wynton Marsalis for Marsalis Standard Time, Vol. I
Best Jazz Instrumental Performance, Big Band
Mercer Ellington for Digital Duke
Best Jazz Fusion Performance, Vocal or Instrumental
Pat Metheny Group for Still Life (Talking)

Latin
Best Latin Pop Performance
Julio Iglesias for Un Hombre Solo
Best Tropical Latin Performance
Eddie Palmieri for La Verdad - The Truth
Best Mexican-American Performance
Los Tigres del Norte for Gracias!... América... Sin Fronteras

Musical show
Best Musical Cast Show Album
Claude-Michel Schönberg (composer), Herbert Kretzmer (lyricist), Alain Boublil, Claude-Michel Schönberg (producers), & the original Broadway cast for Les Misérables

Music video
Best Concept Music Video
Genesis for "Land of Confusion"
Best Performance Music Video
 Anthony Eaton (video producer) for The Prince's Trust All-Star Rock Concert performed by various artists

New Age
Best New Age Performance
Yusef Lateef for Yusef Lateef's Little Symphony

Packaging and notes
Best Album Package
Bill Johnson (art director) for King's Record Shop performed by Rosanne Cash
Best Album Notes
Orrin Keepnews (notes writer) for Thelonious Monk - The Complete Riverside Recordings performed by Thelonious Monk

Polka
Best Polka Recording
A Polka Just for Me – Jimmy Sturr

Pop
 Best Pop Vocal Performance, Female
 "I Wanna Dance with Somebody (Who Loves Me)" – Whitney Houston
 Best Pop Vocal Performance, Male
 "Bring on the Night (live)" – Sting
 Best Pop Performance by a Duo or Group with Vocal
 "(I've Had) The Time of My Life" – Bill Medley & Jennifer Warnes
 Best Pop Instrumental Performance (Orchestra, Group or Soloist)
 "Minute by Minute" – Larry Carlton

Production and engineering
 Best Engineered Recording, Non-Classical
 Bruce Swedien & Humberto Gatica (engineers) for Bad performed by Michael Jackson
 Best Engineered Recording, Classical
 Jack Renner (engineer), Robert Shaw (conductor) & the Atlanta Symphony Orchestra for Fauré: Requiem/Duruflé: Requiem
 Producer of the Year, (Non Classical)
 Narada Michael Walden
 Classical Producer of the Year
 Robert Woods

R&B
 Best R&B Vocal Performance, Female
 Aretha Franklin for Aretha
 Best R&B Vocal Performance, Male 
 Smokey Robinson for "Just to See Her"
 Best R&B Performance by a Duo or Group with Vocal
 Aretha Franklin & George Michael for "I Knew You Were Waiting (For Me)"
 Best R&B Instrumental Performance (Orchestra, Group or Soloist)
 David Sanborn for "Chicago Song" 
 Best Rhythm & Blues Song
 Bill Withers (songwriter) for "Lean on Me" performed by Club Nouveau

Reggae
 Best Reggae Recording
 No Nuclear War – Peter Tosh

Rock
Best Rock Vocal Performance, Solo
 "Tunnel of Love" – Bruce Springsteen
 Best Rock Performance by a Duo or Group with Vocal
 The Joshua Tree – U2
Best Rock Instrumental Performance (Orchestra, Group or Soloist)
 "Jazz from Hell" – Frank Zappa

Spoken
 Best Spoken Word or Non-musical Recording
 Garrison Keillor for Lake Wobegon Days

External links
30th Grammy Awards, from the Internet Movie Database

References

 030
1988 music awards
1988 in New York City
Radio City Music Hall
1988 in American music
1988 awards in the United States
March 1988 events in the United States